Google Meet (formerly known as Hangouts Meet) is a video-communication service developed by Google. It is one of two apps that constitute the replacement for Google Hangouts, the other being Google Chat. It replaced the consumer-facing Google Duo in late 2022, with the Duo mobile app being renamed Meet and the original Meet app set to be phased out.

In the early months of the COVID-19 pandemic, Google announced Meet was to be made available to all users, not just Google Workspace users, in which it previously was. The use of Meet grew by a factor of 30 between January and April 2020, with 100 million users a day accessing Meet, compared to 200 million daily users for Zoom as of the last week of April 2020.

History

After being invite-only and quietly releasing an iOS app in February 2017, Google formally launched Meet in March 2017. The service was unveiled as a video conferencing app for up to 30 participants, described as an enterprise-friendly version of Hangouts. It was available through applications for desktop, Android, and an iOS. 

While Google Meet introduced the above features to upgrade the original Hangouts application, some standard Hangouts features were deprecated, including viewing attendees and chat simultaneously. The number of video feeds allowed at one time was also reduced to 8 (while up to 4 feeds can be shown in the "tiles" layout), prioritizing those attendees who most recently used their microphone. Additionally, features such as the chatbox were changed to overlay the video feeds, rather than resizing the latter to fit. In November 2022, Hangouts was officially converted and no longer available. Google suspended its usual 60-minute limit for unpaid accounts. 

In August 2020, it was reported that Google was planning to eventually merge Google Duo with the business-oriented Google Meet. In December 2021 this objective had been dropped, but Duo continued to be available and updated. In June 2022, Google reversed course and announced that Duo would, in fact, be merged into Meet. The merger began in August, with the Duo mobile app being renamed Meet. The Google Duo web app now also redirects to the Google Meet web app. The original Meet app is intended to be phased out over the next months.

Features 
Features of Google Meet include:

 Two-way and multi-way audio and video calls with a resolution up to 720p
 An accompanying chat
 Call encryption between all users
 Noise-canceling audio filter (depending on the license only)
 Low-light mode for video
 Shared whiteboard, reactions, polls, voting, Q&A (depending on the license)
 Team activities – shared YouTube and Spotify watching, playing mini games like UNO! Mobile, Kahoot! and Heads Up!
 Google document sharing (documents, spreadsheets, presentations)
 Integration with the Google ecosystem, e.g. live streaming to YouTube, Google Calendar and Google Contacts for one-click meeting calls
 Screen-sharing, browser tab sharing
 Ability to join meetings through a web browser or through Android or iOS apps
 "Knock Knock" shows a live preview of the caller before the recipient picks up, which Google says is to "make calls feel more like an invitation rather than an interruption".
 Ability to call into meetings using a dial-in number (US numbers always; international numbers when included in Workspace license)
 Hosts being able to deny a user's entry to, remove a user from, and control microphone and video access in a call. 
 Video filters, effects, backgrounds and augmented reality masks.
 Ability to join meetings through a web browser or through Android or iOS apps

Google Workspace accounts 
Features for users who use Google Workspace accounts include:

 Up to 100 members per call for Google Workspace Starter users, up to 150 for Google Workspace Business users, and up to 250 for Google Workspace Enterprise users.
 Ability to call into meetings with a dial-in number from selected countries.
 Ability to record the meeting.
 Password-protected dial-in numbers for Google Workspace Enterprise edition users.
 Real-time closed captioning based on speech recognition.
 Background blurring and virtual backgrounds.
 Real-time translations of the automatically generated closed captions

In March 2020, Google temporarily extended advanced features present in the enterprise edition to anyone using Google Workspace or G Suite for Education editions. In January 2022, these features were removed for educators and workspace users unless they subscribed.

Gmail accounts
In March 2020, Google rolled out Meet to personal (free) Google accounts.

Free Meet calls can only have a single host and up to 100 participants, compared to the 250-caller limit for Google Workspace users and the 25-participant limit for Hangouts. Unlike business calls with Meet, consumer calls are not recorded and stored, and Google states that consumer data from Meet will not be used for advertisement targeting. While call data is reportedly not being used for advertising purposes, based on an analysis of Meet's privacy policy, Google reserves the right to collect data on call duration, who is participating, and participants' IP addresses.

Users need a Google account to initiate calls and like Google Workspace users, anyone with a Google account is able to start a Meet call from within Gmail.

Technologies 
In accordance with the WebRTC standard, Google Meet uses VP8 and VP9 video codecs for video stream compression and Opus audio codec for voice stream compression. In April 2020, Google announced plans to support the AV1 video codec.

Google Meet uses proprietary protocols for audio and video stream control. Interoperability between Google Meet and SIP/H.323-based conferencing equipment and software is available for Google Workspace customers through third-party services.

Google Meet is optimized for low-bandwidth mobile networks through WebRTC and uses QUIC over UDP. Optimization is further achieved through the degradation of video quality through monitoring network quality. For packet loss concealment Meet uses WaveNetEQ.

Hardware 
In May 2020, Asus unveiled videoconferencing hardware designed for use with Google Meet in conference room settings, which includes a "Meet Compute System" mini PC, and a dedicated camera and microphone.

On September 15, 2020, Google unveiled Meet Series One, in partnership with Lenovo, which includes a Meet Compute System with Edge TPU, "Smart Camera", "Smart Audio Bar" with noise reduction, and a choice of remote control or touchscreen that supports the Google Assistant.

See also
 Microsoft Teams
 Zoom

References

Google instant messaging software
Telecommunication services
VoIP services
VoIP software
IOS software
Android (operating system) software
Cross-platform software
2017 software
Web conferencing
Meet
Videotelephony
Google services
Google software
Communication software